The Parc botanique de Cornouaille (4 hectares) is a botanical garden located in Kerlever, Combrit, Finistère, Brittany, France. It is open daily in the warmer months; an admission fee is charged.

The garden was established by Jean-Pierre Gueguen in 1981. Today it contains about 3500 plant varieties, with good collections of camellias (550 varieties), rhododendrons (400), magnolias (85), azaleas (80), and hortensias (60). Plantings of interest include Acer trautvetteri, Camellia caudata, Cleyera japonica, Corylus jacquemontii, Distylium racemosum, Embothrium coccineum, Enkianthus perulatus, Magnolia rostrata, and Rhododendron campylocarpum, as well as an aquatic garden. The park also contains a mineral museum displaying 1200 specimens from the Armorican Massif and elsewhere.

See also 
 List of botanical gardens in France

References 

 Sources
 Parc botanique de Cornouaille
 Parcs et Jardins entry (French)
 Au Jardin entry (French)
 1001 Fleurs entry (French)
 Conservatoire des Jardins et Paysages entry (French)
 Association des Parcs et Jardins de Bretagne entry (French)

Cornouaille, Parc botanique de
Cornouaille, Parc botanique de